The Archaeological Museum of Populonia, opened in 2001 in the town of Piombino, Italy, contains artifacts from what was the ancient territory of Populonia (Val di Cornia) during a period ranging from prehistory to late antiquity. The museum contains an active center of experimental archaeology with a focus on the processing of ceramics and stone.

The building
The museum is located in a historic building that was part of the Citadel, the seat of the princes of Appiani and later of Princess Elisa Baciocchi, sister of Napoleon. This is the new building (the old stables and lodgings of the court of Appiani) which, before the museum was used for housing, served as barracks for public safety and a vocational school.

Exhibition
The museum aims to illustrate the history of the territory and the use of its resources, in particular mining. The exhibits are dated from the prehistoric to the Etruscan and Roman times.

The organization within the museum follows the chronological history of the area: the first rooms are devoted to prehistoric artifacts (from the Stone Age to the Bronze Age), the center rooms to the Etruscan period, and the last to the Roman period and late antiquity. Apart from artifacts, the different periods are also illustrated by a series of panels that cover the walls of the rooms, and in some cases around the windows. There are also exhibited models of production facilities (ovens and proto-historic Etruscans), a tomb, and the cargo of a ship.

The Anfora Baratti
The most important artifact in the museum is the preserved silver Anfora of Baratti, accidentally found at sea in the nets of a fishing vessel in the waters of the Gulf of Baratti in 1968 and patiently restored. This vase, dating from the 4th century BC, is decorated with 134 medallions depicting myths and pagan gods, linked to the worship of the goddess Cybele.

Not only is this a rare piece of silverware, but it is also an example illustrating the persistence of pagan culture among some of the Roman Empire after the conversion to Christianity.

Other finds
Other important items at the museum include the fish mosaic, depicting a shipwreck scene and dating to the 2nd century BC, the Tesoretto Rimigliano (a collection of Roman coins found at sea), the cargo of the wreck of Pozzino (from the 2nd century BC), and several sets of Etruscan tombs.  Among the tombs are reported to be the Tomb of Goldsmiths (7th century BC), the Tomb of the Bidder Bronzetto (6th-4th century BC) and the Tomb of the Cave 14 (4th-3rd century BC) found during an excavation in 1997-1998.

A stone engraving of a bison in prehistoric times is another item that stands out within the museum's collection.

Bibliography
G. De Tommaso, Populonia. Una città e il suo territorio. Guida al Museo Archeologico di Piombino, Poggibonsi 2003

See also
Piombino
Populonia
Baratti (town)
Necropolis of Populonia
Baratti and Populonia Archeological Park

External links

Pagina sul Museo nel sito del Comune
Tourism for Archeological Museum of Populonia

Archaeological museums in Italy
Piombino
Museums in Tuscany